Booze & Glory is a Polish-British Street Punk band from London, formed in 2009.

History 
Booze & Glory was formed in London in 2009 by Mark (vocals), Liam (guitar), Bartez (bass) and Mario (drums). Mark, Bartez and Mario are originally from Poland and were already known in the Oi! scene there. In 2010 the band released their debut album Always on the Wrong Side through 84 Records. Two Split EPs followed, one with the Harington Saints and the other with The Warriors. In 2011 the band released their second album, Trouble Free. The band have also released various EPs as well as a Singles Collection, with the song "London Skinhead Crew", for which a video was also recorded. The video has been viewed around twenty million times and has so far been the band's most successful song.

In 2013 Bartez and Mario left the group citing family reasons. They were replaced by the Swedish drummer T. Cliché (from The Clichés and Clockwork Crew) and Bubbles. The band signed a recording contract with Step-1 Music in 2014 and released their album As Bold as Brass. In 2017 the band released Chapter IV and in 2019 they released Hurricane.

Music style and lyrics 
Booze & Glory play modern British Oi! with many singalongs and catchy rhythms. In their lyrics they cover many British topics, from singing about the working class to their description of the London skinhead scene via songs about drinking beer. Their lyrics show patriotism towards England and pride in London and the football club West Ham United. However the band is also proud to have members of  different nationalities, and has positioned itself clearly against the right-wing Skinhead scene, while taking an apolitical stance otherwise.

Members 

Current members
 Mark Marlowski – vocals, rhythm guitar (2009–present)
 Chema Zurita – bass guitar, backing vocals (2017–present)
 Kahan – guitars, backing vocals (2018–present)
 Frank Pellegrino – drums, percussion, backing vocals (2015–present)

Former members
 Liam Marr – vocals, guitar (2009–2017)
 Mario – drums (2009–2013)
 Bart – bass, backing vocals (2009–2012)
 bubbles – bass, backing vocals (2012–2017)
 Tommy Storback – drums (2013–2015)
 Psycho Al bass, backing vocals (2017)

 Timeline

Discography

Albums 
 2010: Always on the Wrong Side (84 Records)
 2011: Trouble Free (84 Records)
 2014: As Bold as Brass (Step-1 Music)
 2017: Chapter IV
 2019: Hurricane

Compilations 
 2012: Oi! Ain't Dead (Split CD with Old Firm Casuals, Razorblade and The Corps, Rebellion Records)
 2013: London Skinhead Crew (Singles Collection) (Step-1 Music)

EPs and singles 
 2010: Bruce Roehrs Memorial (Split EP with Harrington Saints, Pirates Press Records)
 2010: England (Split EP with The Warriors, Randale Records)
 2012: ...On the Booze! (Split EP with On the Job, Contra Records)
 2012: Oi! The Super Heroes (Split EP with Agent Bulldogg, Gimp Fist and The Sandals, Bad Look Records)
 2012: "Back Where We Belong" (feat. Micky Fitz, 7", Step-1 Music)
 2017: The Reggae Session Vol 1 (with Vespa & The Londonians, Contra Records)

References

External links 
 

Oi! groups
Musical groups from London
Musical groups established in 2009